Neysky District is an administrative and municipal district (raion), one of the twenty-four in Kostroma Oblast, Russia. It is located in the center of the oblast. Its administrative center is the town of Neya (which is not administratively a part of the district). Population:  6,018 (2002 Census);

Administrative and municipal status
Within the framework of administrative divisions, Neysky District is one of the twenty-four in the oblast. The town of Neya serves as its administrative center, despite being incorporated separately as a town of oblast significance—an administrative unit with the status equal to that of the districts.

As a municipal division, the district is incorporated as Neysky Municipal District, with the town of oblast significance of Neya being incorporated within it as Neya Urban Settlement.

References

Notes

Sources

Districts of Kostroma Oblast
 
